Yaritani (yarita local name for Azorella compacta, Aymara -ni a suffix, "the one with the yarita plant", also spelled Yaretani) is a mountain in the Bolivian Andes which reaches a height of approximately . It is located in the Cochabamba Department, Tapacari Province. Yaritani lies southeast of Llust'a Q'asa.

References 

Mountains of Cochabamba Department